Boswell Bay State Marine Park is a 3,047 acre undeveloped Alaska state marine park on the eastern tip of Hinchinbrook Island, approximately 15 miles southwest of Cordova. Areas of the park are adjacent to the Copper River Delta State Critical Habitat. In 1964, an earthquake uplifted a substantial part of the park, moving the shore inland by more than a mile.

Popular activities include beach combing, hunting, boating, camping, and clamming. There is no source of fresh water within the park.

The park is home to shorebird rookeries and is a primary seabird and waterfowl migratory path.

See also 

 List of Alaska state parks

External links

References

Protected areas of Chugach Census Area, Alaska
State parks of Alaska